Pont-de-Labeaume is a commune in the Ardèche department in southern France.

Geography
The river Lignon forms small part of the commune's western border, then joins the Ardèche, which flows east through the commune.

The village is located in the western part of the commune, on the right bank of the Ardèche.

Population

See also
Communes of the Ardèche department

References

Communes of Ardèche
Ardèche communes articles needing translation from French Wikipedia